Major General G.L. Sigera, KSV, SLAOC is a Sri Lankan general, who was the former Master-General of the Ordnance, Sri Lanka Army and Aide-de-camp to President William Gopallawa

References 

Sri Lankan major generals
Sinhalese military personnel
Alumni of Royal College, Colombo
Living people
Year of birth missing (living people)
Place of birth missing (living people)